The Mount Vernon Arsenal-Searcy Hospital Complex may refer to either of two entities that have occupied the same site:
Mount Vernon Arsenal
Searcy Hospital